The Mukti Sangharsh is the central organ of the Communist Party of India in Hindi. Mahesh Rathi is the current editor of Mukti Sangharsh.

References

Weekly newspapers published in India
Hindi-language newspapers
Weekly journals
Communist Party of India
Communist newspapers
Communist periodicals published in India